Ansell is an unincorporated community in central Alberta, Canada.

The small farming community is located immediately west of the Town of Edson, between the Yellowhead Highway and the Canadian National Railway.

The community is administered by the Yellowhead County.

Localities in Yellowhead County